Harper Creek High School is a high school in the Harper Creek School District located just outside the city of Battle Creek, Michigan. In 2005, Harper Creek opened a new high school, which includes computer labs, electronic lockers (removed 2017), overhead projectors in all rooms, a gymnasium with three basketball courts, an 850-seat auditorium and an eight-lane swimming pool, as well as a bowling alley in the basement.

Optional programs
 Battle Creek Area Mathematics and Science Center
 Calhoun Area Career Center (Changed in the 2007-2008 school year from the Calhoun Area Tech Center)
 Dual enrollment in college courses for juniors and seniors

Extracurricular activities
There are many extracurricular activities available to students at Harper Creek High School. These include: Student Government; Distributive Educational Clubs of America (DECA); the Harper Creek chapter of the National Honor Society (NHS); Students Against Destructive Decisions (SADD); Asset; etc.

Quiz Bowl
In 2003, the Harper Creek Quiz Bowl team won the Class B State Championship and advanced to a national tournament.

Athletics
Harper Creek uses the Beaver as a mascot.

Harper Creek now competes in the Interstate 8 Athletic Conference.

Sports teams include:
 Boys' and Girls' swimming
 Boys' and Girls' cross country
 Boys' and Girls' tennis
 Boys' and Girls' soccer
 Wrestling
 Boys' and Girls' basketball
 Boys' and Girls' track
 Boys' and Girls' golf
 Baseball
 Softball
 Football
 Cheerleading
 Dance
 Volleyball
 Lacrosse
 Bowling

References

External links

Harper Creek school district

1949 establishments in Michigan
Battle Creek, Michigan
Public high schools in Michigan
Schools in Calhoun County, Michigan